Albeli may refer to:
 Albeli (1955 film), an Indian Hindi-language romantic drama film
 Albeli (1974 film), a 1974 Indian Hindi-language film

See also 

 Albela (disambiguation)